Jaco-Albert van Gass  (born 20 August 1986) is a South African-born British racing cyclist who competes in para-cycling track events. He won two gold medals and one bronze medal at the Tokyo 2020 Paralympic Games. He is a three times world record holder in Track cycling.

Deployment in Afghanistan
Van Gass was born in South Africa. At the age of 20, he moved to the UK to join the British Armed Forces. In mid-2007, he finished his training and became a member of the Parachute Regiment. During his second deployment to Afghanistan in 2009, he was hit by a rocket-propelled grenade, losing his lower left arm, puncturing internal organs, and suffering a collapsed lung, shrapnel and blast wounds, and leg fractures.

Athletic career
Van Gass first learned to ski and took part in competitions as a member of the Combined Services Disabled Ski Team. In 2011, he was the first South African-born person to conquer the eighth highest mountain in the world at 8,164 metres, the Manaslu in the Himalayas. In 2012, he made an attempt to climb Mount Everest, which failed due to poor weather conditions. In the meantime, he has also successfully completed marathons. 

In December 2013, van Gass was part of a group of disabled soldiers who, together with Prince Harry, completed a 335-kilometre march to the South Pole for the benefit of the aid organization Walking With The Wounded. This raised £1.5 million in donations that were to be used for the athletic rehabilitation of wounded soldiers.

Van Gass then turned his interest to cycling and was accepted into the Paralympic Development Program in 2013. At the Invictus Games in September 2014, he won two gold medals in cycling. Since the end of 2014, he has been participating in the Paralympic Academy Program of British Cycling.

Van Gass made his debut at the 2015 UCI Para-cycling Track World Championships and finished seventh in the individual pursuit and eighth in the 1,000 metre time trial. At the 2016 UCI Para-cycling Track World Championships in Montichiari, Italy, he won the bronze medal in the scratch race. Two years later, at the 2018 UCI Para-cycling Track World Championships in Rio de Janeiro, he finished third in the individual pursuit. In 2020, he won a silver medal in the pursuit and gold medals in the kilo, scratch race and omnium. 

At the 2020 Summer Paralympics, van Gass won the gold medal in the men's individual pursuit C3, mixed team sprint C1–5 and the bronze medal in the men's time trial C1–3.

Van Gass was appointed a Member of the Order of the British Empire (MBE) in the 2022 New Year Honours for services to cycling.

References

External links
 

1986 births
Living people
People from Steve Tshwete Local Municipality
British male cyclists
Paralympic cyclists of Great Britain
Paralympic gold medalists for Great Britain
Paralympic bronze medalists for Great Britain
Cyclists at the 2020 Summer Paralympics
South African emigrants to the United Kingdom
Medalists at the 2020 Summer Paralympics
British Army personnel of the War in Afghanistan (2001–2021)
British Parachute Regiment soldiers
Naturalised citizens of the United Kingdom
Members of the Order of the British Empire